Rakity is a rural locality (a selo) and the administrative center of Rakitovsky Selsoviet of Rubtsovsky District, Altai Krai, Russia. The population was 1,029 in 2016. There are 9 streets.

Geography 
Rakity is located 39 km west of Rubtsovsk (the district's administrative centre) by road. Bolshaya Shelkovka is the nearest rural locality.

References 

Rural localities in Rubtsovsky District